The South African Railways Dock Shunter 0-4-0T of 1909 was a steam locomotive.

A single second-hand  locomotive was bought by the South African Railways in 1941 and employed as harbour shunting engine in Cape Town. The engine had, until then, been used as construction locomotive by the contractors who undertook the construction of the new Table Bay harbour.

Origin
When the old Table Bay harbour in Cape Town became inadequate to cope with the vast increase in shipping, a contract was awarded to the Hollandse Anneming Maatschappij Eiendoms Beperk to construct a new harbour. Work to reclaim ground on the Foreshore, dredge the New Basin and build new and deeper docks began in 1938. The contractors brought out a small  locomotive to use on site for general haulage work. The locomotive's arrival date is not known, but it was removed from Dutch boiler records in October 1939.

The locomotive had been built by Orenstein & Koppel in Berlin in 1909, originally as a   gauge locomotive for the Fix Söhne Bauunternehmung in Meiderich. It was later regauged to  Cape gauge and transferred or sold to the Dutch contractors.

Service
In 1940, the South African Railways bought the locomotive from the contractors out of hand. It was not classified in Railway service, but was numbered 69 and bore cab-side plates lettered "SAR-H&NW". It remained in use as a dock shunter in Table Bay harbour into the 1950s.

References

1030
1030
B locomotives
0-4-0T locomotives
Orenstein & Koppel locomotives
Cape gauge railway locomotives
Railway locomotives introduced in 1909 
1939 in South Africa 
Scrapped locomotives